Alibrandi is a surname of Italian origin. Notable people with the surname include:

Alessandro Alibrandi  (1960–1981), Italian neofascist terrorist
Enrico Cruciani Alibrandi (1839–1921), Italian politician
Gaetano Alibrandi (1914–2003), Italian titular archbishop
Girolamo Alibrandi (1470–1524), Italian painter

See also 
Looking for Alibrandi (film), is an Australian film
Looking for Alibrandi (novel), novel of Australian author Melina Marchetta